John Marshall (May 24, 1856 – August 19, 1922) served as the 27th Lieutenant Governor of Kentucky under Governor William S. Taylor from 1899 to 1900. Both Governor Taylor and Lieutenant Governor Marshall were removed from office by a Supreme Court decision that ruled that William Goebel had rightly been elected governor in the contested 1899 election.

References

1856 births
1922 deaths
Kentucky Republicans
Lieutenant Governors of Kentucky
Politicians from Louisville, Kentucky